Felipe de Jesús Alvarado Mendoza (born January 8, 1982) is a Mexican luchador, or professional wrestler best known by the ring name La Máscara for his time working for Lucha Libre AAA Worldwide (AAA) and was the co-founder and leader of Los Mercenarios (alongside El Hijo del Fantasma, Rey Escorpión, and Texano Jr.).

Alvarado worked for Consejo Mundial de Lucha Libre (CMLL) since 2001 until 2017, during that time he won several championships including the CMLL World Light Heavyweight Championship, CMLL World Tag Team Championship, CMLL World Trios Championship, NWA World Historic Middleweight Championship, Mexican National Light Heavyweight Championship, Mexican National Trios Championship, and Mexican National Welterweight Championship. Alvarado is a founding member of Los Ingobernables along with Rush and La Sombra.

Alvarado is the son of Jesús Alvarado Nieves, better known under the name Brazo de Oro, and the promotion acknowledges the relationship. many of the Alvarado family have been, or currently are professional wrestlers, including family patriarch Shadito Cruz and uncles who worked under the ring names Brazo de Plata, El Brazo, Brazo Cibernético. Brazo de Platino and Súper Brazo. Many of Felipe Alvarado's cousins are also wrestlers including Psycho Clown, Máximo Sexy and Goya Kong among others. Alvarado originally used the name Brazo de Oro Jr. ("Golden Arm Jr.) after his father.

Personal life
Felipe de Jesús Alvarado Mendoza was born on January 8, 1982, son of Jesús Alvarado Nieves and grandson of Juan Alvarado Ibarra, better known under the professional wrestling ring name Shadito Cruz. Jesús Alvarado and five of his brothers had following in Shadito Cruz's footsteps and all became professional wrestlers as well. Jesús Alvarado was the oldest brother and became known as Brazo de Oro ('Golden Arm") while his brothers would be known as Brazo de Plata ('Silver Arm"), El Brazo ("The Arm"), Brazo Cibernético ("Cyborg Arm"), Brazo de Platino ("Platinum Arm") and Súper Brazo. for a while Jesús Alvarado was married to Sandra González Calderón, better known as Lady Apache, Felipe Alvarado's step mother. Growing up Felipe Alvarado and several of his cousins would often attend wrestling events together, which led to Felipe and his cousins José Christian Alvarado (later known as Máximo) and the wrestler later known as Psycho Clown (real name unrevealed). Several of his cousins would later follow them into the wrestling business such as Robin, Goya Kong, Muñeca de Plata, Brazo Cibernetico Jr. and Brazo Celestial. Over the years several wrestler have paid to use the "Brazo" name, leading to some confusion and uncertainty to how many Alvarado family members have actually been professional wrestlers; it has been confirmed that Brazo Metálico, Brazo Jr. and Andros de Plata were not related to the Alvarado family.

Professional wrestling career
Felipe Alvarado received most of his early training from his father, often in the Consejo Mundial de Lucha Libre ("World Wrestling Council"; CMLL) where his father served as a trainer for several CMLL trainees.

Brazo de Oro Jr. (2000-2005)
After his initial training, Felipe Alvarado would make his official wrestling debut on April 2, 2000, using the ring name "Brazo de Oro Jr.", wearing the same mask design as his father. As Brazo de Oro Jr. he often teamed up with his cousins (José Christian Alvarado and his brother) who worked as Brazo de Platino Jr. and Brazo de Plata Jr. respectively, collectively referred to as Los Brazos Junior. The trio worked primarily for CMLL, normally in the early parts of the shows as they gained in-ring experience. During the summer of 2002 Brazo de Oro Jr. was involved in his first significant storyline feud against a local wrestler on Oaxaca known as Némesis. On August 24, 2002, Brazo de Oro Jr. defeated Némesis  in a Lucha de Apuestas, or "bet match", after which Némesis was forced to unmask. In Lucha libre the Lucha de Apuestas matches are generally considered more prestigious than winning a championship. Through CMLL's working relationship with International Wrestling Revolution Group Los Brazos Junior worked several major shows for that promotion. Including the Arena Naucalpan 26th Anniversary Show on December 21, 2003, where they defeated the trio of Angel de Tijuana and Los Megas (Mega and Ultra Mega). and the subsequent IWRG 8th Anniversary Show on January 1, 2004, where they defeated Los Comandos (Comando Alfa, Comando Delta and Comando Gama).

La Máscara (2005-2017)
In 2005 all of the Brazos Junior members took on a new name, creating their own identity in Lucha Libre. Felipe Alvarado took the enmascarado (masked character) "La Máscara" ("The Mask"). In May 2005, he won his first major championship when he defeated Doctor X for the Mexican National Welterweight Championship. He held the title for over a year, before he lost the belt to Sangre Azteca on December 17, 2006. Earlier that year, he lost to Hajime Ohara in a match for the then vacant NWA World Welterweight Championship in Mexico City. La Máscara has been pushed strongly since changing to that gimmick (from Brazo de Oro Jr.), with some thought that it might be due to his family connections. His work has appeared to catch up with his push this year, and he's a solid high flier. On June 13, 2008, La Máscara teamed with Héctor Garza and El Hijo del Fantasma in a tournament for the vacant CMLL World Trios Championship and won the titles after beating Blue Panther, Dos Caras, Jr. and Místico in the finals. The three held the titles for over seven weeks until they lost it to Último Guerrero, Negro Casas and Atlantis on August 5. La Máscara and his partners regained the titles on a show in Guadalajara on January 18, 2009. On January 29, 2010, La Máscara teamed up with Negro Casas to participate in CMLL's "Torneo Nacional de Pareja Increíbles" ("National Amazing Pairs tournament"), a tournament where CMLL teams up a Tecnico (La Máscara) and a Rudo (Casas) for a tournament. The two defeated El Texano, Jr. and Rouge in the opening round, El Sagrado and Shocker in the second round and Héctor Garza and Toscano in the semi-final to earn a spot in the final of the tournament. On February 5, 2010, Casas and La Máscara lost to Máscara Dorada and Atlantis in the finals.

In March 2010 signs of dissention amongst the Trios champions began showing as Garza walked out on the team during a trios match mistakenly thinking that one of his teammates had attacked him. Following the walk out Garza kept insincerely insisting that he was still a tecnico and that his team was getting along great. Further doubts about Garza's allegiance arose when he teamed up with the Rúdo Pólvora to win the 2010 Gran Alternativa tournament. When Garza, La Máscara and Hijo del Fantasma were booked for a CMLL World Trios defense the following week Garza complained that his partners agreed to the match without asking him, but swore that he would still be professional about it. During the title defense on the May 7, 2010 Super Viernes Garza attacked both Hijo del Fantasma and La Máscara, allowing La Ola Amarilla (Hiroshi Tanahashi, Okumura and Taichi) to win the CMLL World Trios Championship, turning full blown Rudo in the process. On May 14, 2010, La Máscara teamed up with Máscara Dorada and La Sombra to defeat Ola Amarilla in a non-title match to earn a shot at the titles the following week. One week later the trio defeated Ola Amarilla again, ending the Japanese trios title reign after just two weeks, making La Máscara a three times Trios Champion By virtue of holding the CMLL World Trios Championship La Máscara participated in the 2010 Universal Championship tournament. He was part of "Block B" that competed on the August 6, 2010 Super Viernes show. In the first round of the tournament he defeated Mr. Águila, then moved on to a match against Volador Jr. during the match Volador Jr. turned rudo (bad guy) after teasing a turn for a long time and got himself disqualified for excessive violence. After the match Volador Jr. beat up La Máscara further, leaving him an easy target for his third round opponent, Jushin Thunder Liger, who quickly defeated La Máscara. On October 5, 2010, La Máscara defeated Volador Jr. to win the Mexican National Light Heavyweight Championship.

On January 22, 2011, La Máscara made his Japanese debut, when he took part in the Fantastica Mania 2011 weekend, co-promoted by CMLL and New Japan Pro-Wrestling in Tokyo. During the first night, he teamed with Tiger Mask in a tag team match, where they were defeated by Dragón Rojo, Jr. and Tomohiro Ishii. The following night, he, Máscara Dorada and La Sombra successfully defended the CMLL World Trios Championship against La Ola Amarilla (Okumura, Tetsuya Naito and Yujiro Takahashi). In April 2011, La Máscara began feuding with the WWE bound Averno, which led to CMLL booking the two to face each other in a Mask vs. Mask Lucha de Apuesta on June 17. On June 17 at Juicio Final, La Máscara picked up the biggest win of his career by defeating Averno two falls to one and forcing him to unmask himself. Afterwards, La Máscara and Averno continued their rivalry, building up to another singles match on July 4, where Averno successfully defended the NWA World Historic Middleweight Championship. On July 15, La Generación Dorada lost the CMLL World Trios Championship to Los Hijos del Averno (Averno, Ephesto and Mephisto). After La Máscara pinned Averno in a six-man tag team match on July 22, the two agreed to another match for the NWA World Historic Middleweight Championship on July 29, where Averno was again able to retain the title. La Máscara and Averno faced each other again on September 9 in the second round of the Universal Championship tournament, where Averno once again was victorious. On November 22, La Máscara defeated Averno to win the NWA World Historic Middleweight Championship. He would go on to lose the title to Volador Jr. on February 14, 2012. On January 18, 2013, La Máscara returned to Japan to take part in the three-day Fantastica Mania 2013 event. During the first night, he teamed with Máscara Dorada and Máximo in a six-man tag team match, where they were defeated by Taichi, Taka Michinoku and Volador Jr. During the second night, he, Hiroshi Tanahashi and Rush were defeated in a six-man tag team match by Kazuchika Okada, Rey Escorpión and Volador Jr. During the third and final night, La Máscara successfully defended the Mexican National Light Heavyweight Championship against Volador Jr. La Máscara was once again forced to team up with Averno, for the 2013 Torneo Nacional de Parejas Increibles, just like he was for the 2012 tournament. The team worked together without too many problems in the first round as they defeated the team of El Hijo de Fantasma and El Felino, but stumbled in the second round as they lost to eventual tournament winners La Sombra and Volador Jr. On April 7, La Máscara returned to New Japan Pro-Wrestling at Invasion Attack, where he and Valiente unsuccessfully challenged Tama Tonga and El Terrible for the CMLL World Tag Team Championship. On June 30, La Máscara, Rush and Titán defeated Los Invasores (Kráneo, Mr. Águila and Psicosis) to win the Mexican National Trios Championship. On August 13, La Máscara lost the Mexican National Light Heavyweight Championship to Mephisto. On October 18, La Máscara and Rush were awarded the CMLL World Tag Team Championship, when Rey Bucanero, one half of the previous champions, was unable to defend the title due to an injury. On February 18, 2014, La Máscara, Rush and Titán lost the Mexican National Trios Championship to La Peste Negra (El Felino, Mr. Niebla and Negro Casas). On June 13, La Máscara and Rush lost the CMLL World Tag Team Championship to Negro Casas and Shocker.

Los Ingobernables (2014–2017)

During the summer, La Máscara formed a trio named Los Ingobernables ("The Ungovernables") with Rush and La Sombra with the three essentially wrestling as rudos and being referred to as the most hated wrestlers in the past decade. On April 8, 2016, La Máscara defeated Ángel de Oro to win the CMLL World Light Heavyweight Championship, becoming the 15th light heavyweight champion in the history of the championship. After the match he got into an altercation with Ángel de Oro's corner man Dragon Lee. On May 13, the partnership between La Máscara and Rush came to an end, when Rush and Pierroth turned on their Los Ingobernables stablemate. Following the turn, La Máscara declared war on the entire Muñoz family, which included Rush, Pierroth, Dragon Lee and Místico. La Máscara won the 2016 Leyenda de Plata tournament when he defeated Negro Casas in the finals, held on July 22. On August 5, La Máscara accepted a challenge from Dragon Lee for a Mask vs. Mask Lucha de Apuestas between the two. On September 2 in the main event of the 83rd Anniversary Show, La Máscara was defeated by Dragon Lee and was forced to unmask and reveal his birthname. Afterwards, La Máscara reconciled with Rush.

On May 19, 2017, footage emerged of Felipe Alvarado and other members of the Alvarado family, including his cousins José (Máximo Sexy), Psycho Clown and Robin, as well as his uncle Daniel Alvarado (Brazo de Platino), destroying an expensive car belonging to José Gutiérrez, better known as Último Guerrero. The vandalism was reportedly motivated by the fact that Gutiérrez had spoken out against Felipe Alvarado as a possible the head of the wrestler's union after the death of Alvarado's father. The head of the CMLL wrestlers' union had been in the Avarado family for over a decade and the Alvarado family believed it should go to someone in their family. On May 22, CMLL publicly fired both Felipe and José Alvarado, as well as Bobby Villa, while also stripping the two Alvarados of their titles.

The Crash (2017–2018) 
On May 30, 2017, La Máscara and Máximo made a surprise appearance at The Crash Lucha Libre, confronting members of the La Rebelión stable. The cousins were originally announced as being booked to wrestle against L.A. Park and Dr. Wagner Jr. in the main event of a Lucha Libre Boom! show, but it was later announced that the match had been changed to L.A. Park vs. Dr. Wagner Jr. as Lucha Libre AAA Worldwide (AAA) did not want wrestlers under contract with AAA (Wagner) to work with La Máscara and Máximo at the moment. In September, Rush and Pierroth arrived in The Crash, reuniting with La Máscara and kick starting a rivalry between Los Ingobernables and La Rebelión.

Lucha Libre AAA Worldwide (2018–2019)
On January 26, La Máscara along with Máximo made their debut in Guerra de Titanes to help his brother Psycho Clown and thus forming his team called, Los Mosqueteros del Diablo ("The Musketeers of the Devil").

On May 4, La Mascara announced his departure from the AAA and declared himself independent.

Alvarado family tree

† = deceased

Championships and accomplishments
Consejo Mundial de Lucha Libre
CMLL World Light Heavyweight Championship (1 time)
CMLL World Tag Team Championship (1 time) – with Rush
CMLL World Trios Championship (3 times) – with Héctor Garza and El Hijo del Fantasma (2), Máscara Dorada and La Sombra (1)
Mexican National Light Heavyweight Championship (1 time)
Mexican National Trios Championship (1 time) – Rush and Titán
Mexican National Welterweight Championship (1 time)
NWA World Historic Middleweight Championship (1 time)
CMLL World Tag Team Championship #1 Contender's Tournament (2013) – with Rush
Leyenda de Plata (2016)
Reyes del Aire (2006)
CMLL Tecnico of the Year (2009)
Torneo Gran Alternativa (2005) – with Atlantis
CMLL Trio of the Year (2009) – with Héctor Garza and El Hijo del Fantasma
CMLL Trio of the Year (2010) – with Máscara Dorada and La Sombra
CMLL Bodybuilding Contest – Advanced (2014)
Pro Wrestling Illustrated
PWI ranked him # 82 of the 500 best singles wrestlers of the PWI 500 in 2012

Luchas de Apuestas record

Footnotes

References

1982 births
Alvarado wrestling family
Living people
Masked wrestlers
Mexican male professional wrestlers
Professional wrestlers from Mexico City
21st-century professional wrestlers
Mexican National Trios Champions
CMLL World Light Heavyweight Champions
CMLL World Tag Team Champions
CMLL World Trios Champions
Mexican National Welterweight Champions
NWA World Historic Middleweight Champions
Mexican National Light Heavyweight Champions